Rolla Township is an inactive township in Phelps County, in the U.S. state of Missouri.

Rolla Township takes its name from Rolla, Missouri.

References

Townships in Missouri
Townships in Phelps County, Missouri